Shrirampur Railway Station is one of the busiest railway stations on the Howrah–Bardhaman main line located in the Hooghly district, in the Indian state of West Bengal. It serves Serampore city.

History 
The first train of the Eastern Railway started its journey from Howrah to Hooghly on 15 August 1854. Its first halt was Bally and its second halt was Serampore.

Electrification 
Electrification of Howrah–Burdwan main line was completed with 25 kV AC overhead system in 1958.

Gallery

References 

Railway stations in Hooghly district
Serampore
Howrah railway division
Kolkata Suburban Railway stations